Brejning is a railway town in Vejle Municipality, Region of Southern Denmark in Denmark, with a population of 3,060 (1 January 2022)

Transportation

Brejning is located at the Fredericia-Aarhus railroad line and is served by Brejning station.

References

Cities and towns in the Region of Southern Denmark
Vejle Municipality